The Great Western Railway (GWR) 2600 Class or Aberdare Class was a class of 2-6-0 steam locomotive built between 1900 and 1907.  They were a freight version of the 3300 and 4120 classes, both 4-4-0 locomotives. Therefore the design was adapted and became a 2-6-0 type; the resulting locomotives were used for hauling coal trains between Aberdare and Swindon.

Numbering
The class began in 1900 with a prototype, No. 33, renumbered 2600 in 1912. The rest were numbered 2601–2680 and were built between 1901 and 1907.

British Railways
British Railways (BR) inherited nos. 2612/20/3/43/51/5/6/62/5/7/9/80 in 1948. By 31 August 1948, only four were left: nos. 2620, 2651, 2655, 2667.

Withdrawal

They were withdrawn from 1934 onwards. Five Aberdares (2640, 2648, 2649, 2652 & 2657) withdrawn in early 1939 were not cut up but stored as Second World War reserves. These five reentered service by January 1940. Their withdrawal began again in 1944 until the last member, number 2667, was withdrawn in October 1949. None of the Aberdare class engines were preserved.

References

External links 

 2600 'Aberdare' class

2600
2-6-0 locomotives
Railway locomotives introduced in 1900
Standard gauge steam locomotives of Great Britain
Scrapped locomotives
Freight locomotives